Hugh Scott (1900–1994) was an American lawyer and politician.

Hugh Scott may also refer to:

 Hugh B. Scott (born 1949), American judge in New York
 Hugh L. Scott (1853–1934), Chief of Staff of the United States Army, 1914–1917
USS Hugh L. Scott (AP-43)
 Hugh Stowell Scott (died 1903), English novelist
 Hugh Scott (entomologist) (1885–1960), British entomologist and biogeographer
 Major Hugh Scott of Gala (1822-1877) Scottish soldier